The Diocese of Raleigh is a Latin Church ecclesiastical territory. or diocese. of the Catholic Church that covers the eastern half of the state of North Carolina in the United States. It is a suffragan diocese in the ecclesiastical province of the metropolitan Archbishop of Atlanta. 

On July 5, 2017, Pope Francis named Luis Rafael Zarama to be the 6th Bishop of Raleigh; Zarama was installed on August 29, 2017, at the recently consecrated Holy Name of Jesus Cathedral in Raleigh.

History

1868 to 1924 
Between 1820 and 1868, the small number of Catholics in North Carolina were under the jurisdiction of the Diocese of Charleston in South Carolina.  It was a suffragan diocese of the Archdiocese of Baltimore in Maryland.  On March 3, 1868, Pope Pius IX erected the Vicariate Apostolic of North Carolina, removing North Carolina from the Diocese of Charleston.  At that time, the pope appointed Reverend James Gibbons from the Archdiocese of Baltimore as the first vicar apostolic.

When Gibbons became vicar apostolic, North Carolina counted fewer than 700 Catholics. In his first four weeks in office, he traveled almost a thousand miles, visiting towns and mission stations and administering the sacraments. He also befriended many Protestants, who greatly outnumbered Catholics in the state, and preached at their churches. Gibbons made many converts to Catholicism.In 1872, Pius IX appointed Gibbons as bishop of the Diocese of Richmond.  The Vatican would not replace   Gibbons in North Carolina for the next 11 years.

In 1876, Benedictine monks from St. Vincent's Archabbey in Latrobe, Pennsylvania, arrived in Belmont, North Carolina to establish a priory.  Pope Leo XIII elevated the priory to an abbey, known as Belmont Abbey, on December 19, 1884 The monks elected Father Leo Haid as their first abbot.  in 1882, Leo XIII appointed Henry P. Northrop from the Diocese of Charleston as the new vicar apostolic of North Carolina.  Northrup resigned from this post in 1888 to serve full time as bishop of Charleston.

On February 4, 1888, Leo XIII appointed Haid as apostolic vicar of North Carolina and titular bishop of Messine;he was consecrated on July 1, 1888.  It was unusual to appoint an acting abbot as the vicar apostolic of a territory. This arrangement became even more unusual when Pope Pius X designated Belmont Abbey as a territorial abbey.  The pope removed Gaston, Catawba, Cleveland, Burke, Lincoln, McDowell, Polk, and Rutherford Counties from the Vicariate Apostolic of North Carolina and put them under Belmont's authority. Haid died in 1924.

1924 to 1962 
On December 12, 1924, several months after Haid's death, Pope Pius XI elevated the Apostolic Vicariate of North Carolina to the Diocese of Raleigh.  It became the first Catholic diocese in North Carolina. Reverend William Hafey of the Archdiocese of Baltimore was appointed as its first bishop. In 1937, Pius XI named Hafey as coadjutor bishop of the Diocese of Scranton. To replace Hafey as bishop of Savannah, the pope appointed Reverend Eugene J. McGuinness from the Archdiocese of Philadelphia that same year.

Pope Pius XII on April 17, 1944, transferred all but Gaston County from the Belmont territorial abbey to the Diocese of Raleigh.  In 1960 Pope John XXIII transferred Gaston County to the Diocese of Raleigh, reducing the territorial abbey to the monastery grounds.  Nevertheless, Belmont's status as a territorial abbey continued, with Abbot Walter Coggin participating in the Second Vatican Council in Rome as an ordinary. Later in 1944, Pius XII named McGuiness as the new bishop of the Diocese of Oklahoma City.

Pius XII appointed Vincent Waters from the Diocese of Richmond as the new bishop of the Diocese of Raleigh in 1944. Waters was accused by some of the diocesan clergy of holding on to idle church property worth millions of dollars while some parishes were in debt. He also denied requests for the creation of a priests' senate, and had his resignation requested by around twenty percent of the clergy.In 1953, a year before Brown v. Board of Education decision by the US Supreme Court, Waters ordered the desegregation of all Catholic churches and schools in the diocese. He described racial segregation as a product of "darkness," and declared that "the time has come for it to end." He also said,"I am not unmindful, as a Southerner, of the force of this virus of prejudice among some persons in the South, as well as in the North. I know, however, that there is a cure for this virus, and that is our faith."

1962 to present 
On February 10, 1962, John XXIII elevated the Diocese of Atlanta to the Archdiocese of Atlanta and transferred the Diocese of Raleigh to it from the Archdiocese of Baltimore.  Pope Paul VI on November 12, 1971, erected the Diocese of Charlotte.  He removed Belmont Abbey and all of its previously owned counties from the Diocese of Raleigh.  This action created the current boundaries of the Diocese of Raleigh. In 1972, Waters expelled five Sisters of Providence nuns from the diocese for not wearing their religious habits while teaching.

After Waters died in 1974, Pope Paul VI appointed Auxiliary Bishop F. Joseph Gossman of the Archdiocese of Baltimore in 1975 to replace him.  Gossman served as bishop in the diocese for 31 years.  After his resignation in 2006, Pope Benedict XVI appointed Auxiliary Bishop Michael Burbidge of the Archdiocese of Philadelphia as the new bishop of Raleigh

Soon after taking office, Burbidge announced the building of a new cathedral for the diocese, to be named the Cathedral of the Holy Name of Jesus. Building preparations began in 2013. Groundbreaking for the new cathedral occurred in 2014, and it was completed in 2017.After the tornado outbreak of April 2011, in which 24 people were killed in North Carolina and other states, Burbidge urged Catholics to include victims and survivors in their Holy Week prayers. He directed the diocese's parishes and mission churches to hold a special collection for a disaster relief fund to be used to help survivors.

In 2016, Pope Francis appointed Burbidge as bishop of the Diocese of Arlington. He appointed Auxiliary Bishop Luis Zarama from the Archdiocese of Atlanta as the first Hispanic bishop of Raleigh.  Zarama is the current bishop of the diocese.

Cathedral churches

The bishop of Raleigh is seated at Holy Name of Jesus Cathedral in Raleigh, North Carolina. The cathedral was designed by the O'Brien and Keane firm of Arlington, Virginia in the Romanesque Revival style.  It contains a cruciform floor plan with a dome over the crossing. Its 42 stained glass windows and stations of the cross came from closed churches in the Archdiocese of Philadelphia.  The Beyer Studio of Philadelphia restored the windows before they were installed. Construction on the cathedral commenced January 3, 2015. It was dedicated on July 26, 2017.

Sacred Heart Cathedral in Raleigh served as the diocesan cathedral from 1924 to 2017. After the dedication of Holy Name of Jesus in 2017, Sacred Heart was relegated to a parish church.

The Basilica Shrine of St. Mary in Wilmington, North Carolina served as a cathedral for the Vicariate Apostolic of North Carolina until its termination in 1924. The former Pro-Cathedral of St. Thomas the Apostle in Wilmington was secularized and sold off by the diocese.

Sexual abuse 
In June 2002, in a meeting with officials of the Diocese of Scranton, a Pennsylvania man claimed to have been sexually assaulted by Edward J. Shoback, a Diocese of Raleigh priest. The alleged attacks took place in North Carolina in the 1970's when the victim was a seminarian in the diocese. The diocese later terminated the victim from seminary study there.

In 2007, Justin Scranton, an English teacher and cross country coach at Cardinal Gibbons High School in Raleigh, admitted to acting inappropriately toward a student. The school suspended him during an investigation. Scranton was arrested on February 28, 2007, on charges that he took indecent liberties with a female student. In March 2007 a group of protesters, some alleged victims of clerical sexual abuse, stood outside the diocesan offices, claiming that Bishop Burbidge refused to meet with them. Later in 2007, the diocese paid almost $2 million to settle sexual misconduct claims made by thirty-seven people against at least fifteen priests since the 1950s. By September 2020, settlements paid by the Diocese of Raleigh in sexual misconduct cases since 1950 totaled $2,717,750.

In July 2015, the North Carolina Court of Appeals ruled to allow the advancement to trial of a lawsuit against the Diocese of Raleigh and Burbidge over an allegation of child sexual abuse by Reverend Edgar Sepulveda. The alleged victim was sixteen year old boy who claimed being abused by Sepulveda when he was a priest of the Santa Teresa del Niño Jesús Mission in Beulaville, North Carolina. Sepulveda denied all the accusations. He had been arrested in 2010 and charged with second-degree sexual offense and sexual battery, but the criminal charges were dropped by Brunswick County prosecutors, citing a lack of evidence. At that time, Burbidge had put Sepulveda on administrative leave, prohibiting him from visiting any parish or Catholic school, and removed him from residence on church grounds. 

Lawyers for the victims claimed that Burbridge had been negligent and had inflicted further emotional distress on the victim by refusing to order Sepulveda to undergo testing for sexually transmitted diseases and then share results with the victim's family. Lawyers for the diocese and Burbridge denied that he or other church officials had any knowledge of Sepulveda's alleged actions. The court allowed the lawsuit to proceed, rejected arguments made by defense lawyers that it violated the separation of church and state in the United States Constitution. 

In 2013, Survivors Network of those Abused by Priests criticized Burbidge for not warning families in the diocese about Raymond P. Melville.  A former Catholic priest accused of sexual abuse crimes in Maine and Maryland, Melville had moved to North Carolina.

In August 2018. a grand jury report regarding sexual abuse in the Catholic Church in Pennsylvania named two former North Carolina priests in the list of 301 priests with credible accusations of sexual abuse.Reverend William Presley and Reverend Robert Spangenberg both worked in the Diocese of Raleigh in the 1970's and 1980's. Presley, whom the report describes as a "violent predator who insinuated himself into the lives of families for the purpose of getting close enough to their children that he could abuse them", had served at a parish in Kinston, North Carolina, from 1981 until 1983.  Spangenberg had served at Our Lady of Guadalupe Catholic Parish in Newton Grove, North Carolina, and Immaculate Conception Catholic Parish in Clinton, North Carolina, from 1977 until 1979.

By May 2020, 29 clergy were listed on the Diocese of Raleigh's list of clergy who, as far back as 1950, had served in the diocese and were "credibly accused" of committing acts of sex abuse. Those listed either had claims of abuse against them while serving in the diocese or had reports of abuse elsewhere.

Bishops

Vicars Apostolic of North Carolina
 James Gibbons (1868–1877), appointed Bishop of Richmond and later Archbishop of Baltimore (elevated to Cardinal in 1886)  - Stanislaus Mark Gross (1880–1881) - appointed, but never actually took possession
 Henry Pinckney Northrop (1881–1888), appointed Bishop of Charleston
 Leo Michael Haid, O.S.B. (1888–1924), concurrently abbot of Belmont Abbey

Bishops of Raleigh
 William J. Hafey (1925–1937), appointed Bishop of Scranton
 Eugene J. McGuinness (1938–1944), appointed Bishop of Oklahoma City-Tulsa
 Vincent S. Waters (1945–1974)
 Francis J. Gossman (1975–2006)
 Michael Francis Burbidge (2006–2016), appointed Bishop of Arlington
 Luis Rafael Zarama (2017–present)

Former auxiliary bishops of Raleigh
 James Johnston Navagh (1952–1957), appointed Bishop of Ogdensburg and later Bishop of Paterson
 Charles Borromeo McLaughlin (1964–1968), appointed Bishop of Saint Petersburg
 George Edward Lynch (1970–1985)

Other diocesan priests who became bishops
 Joseph Lennox Federal, appointed Auxiliary Bishop of Salt Lake in 1951
 Michael Joseph Begley, appointed Bishop of Charlotte in 1971
 Joseph Lawson Howze, appointed Auxiliary Bishop of Natchez-Jackson in 1972
 Bernard Shlesinger, appointed Auxiliary Bishop of Atlanta in 2017

Statistics and extent of the diocese 
As of 2015, the Diocese of Raleigh served 231,230 Catholics (4.7% of 4,874,815 total) on 82,556 km² in 79 parishes and 5 missions with 162 priests (114 diocesan, 48 religious), 73 deacons, 90 lay religious (52 brothers, 38 sisters) and 29 seminarians.

In 2010, the diocese contained seven Catholic centers on college campuses; 70 active diocesan priests and 49 active religious priests; 64 religious sisters; 47 religious men; 217,000 registered Catholics; and 240,000 unregistered Hispanics.

Catholic education in the diocese 
The Diocese of Raleigh currently has two high schools, as well as a lay-run high school and many lower schools. These include;

High schools 
 John Paul II Catholic High School, Greenville
 Cardinal Gibbons High School, Raleigh
 St. Thomas More Academy, Raleigh (run by laypeople)

Radio station
The diocese is the licensee for a low power FM station, WSHP-LP, 103.3 MHz, located in Cary, North Carolina. Responsibility for this station's operation is primarily held by Divine Mercy Radio, Inc., a local lay apostolate organization.

See also 

 Historical list of the Catholic bishops of the United States
 List of the Catholic dioceses of the United States
 List of Roman Catholic archdioceses (by country and continent)
 List of Roman Catholic dioceses (alphabetical) (including archdioceses)
 List of Roman Catholic dioceses (structured view) (including archdioceses)

References

Bibliography

Sources and external links
 Roman Catholic Diocese of Raleigh Official Site
 GCatholic with Google map 
 Catholic Hierarchy of Raleigh, North Carolina 
 NC Catholic Magazine

 
Roman Catholic dioceses in the United States
Roman Catholic Ecclesiastical Province of Atlanta
Catholic Church in North Carolina
Religious organizations established in 1868
Roman Catholic dioceses and prelatures established in the 19th century
1868 establishments in North Carolina